Sahir Abdool Edoo (born 13 October 1987) is a Mauritian badminton player. He competed at the 2010 and 2014 Commonwealth Games. He is now serves as a secretary general at the Badminton Confederation of Africa.

Achievements

African Championships
Mixed doubles

BWF International Challenge/Series
Men's doubles

Mixed doubles

 BWF International Challenge tournament
 BWF International Series tournament
 BWF Future Series tournament

References

External links
 

1987 births
Living people
Mauritian people of Indian descent
People from Plaines Wilhems District
Mauritian male badminton players
Commonwealth Games competitors for Mauritius
Badminton players at the 2010 Commonwealth Games
Badminton players at the 2014 Commonwealth Games
Competitors at the 2007 All-Africa Games
African Games competitors for Mauritius